The 1894 Notre Dame football team was an American football team that represented the University of Notre Dame in the 1894 college football season. In its first season with a coach, James L. Morrison, the team compiled a 3–1–1 record and outscored its opponents by a combined total of 80 to 31.

Schedule

References

Notre Dame
Notre Dame Fighting Irish football seasons
Notre Dame football